Secondina Lorenza Eugenia Cesano (16 February 1879 - 13 August 1973) was an Italian numismatist and professor of numismatics at the Sapienza University of Rome.

Biography
Cesano originally studied at the Sapienza University of Rome. In 1902 she won a competition and gained a role at the National Roman Museum. In 1907 she gained habilitation in numismatics at Sapienza. She also worked on numismatics in the National Archaeological Museum, Naples and the National Museum of Ravenna. In 1912, at the foundation of the Istituto italiano di numismatica, Cesano was appointed to the board of directors, later becoming its extraordinary commissar from 1943 to 1944.

Cesano was an Honorary Fellow of the Royal Numismatic Society.

Select publications
1904 (with Adolf Schulten and Dante Vaglieri) L'Africa romana. Rome: Albrighi.
1915. Il medagliere dell'ex-Museo Kircheriano. Parte I, Monete fuse. Roma : Presso la sede dell'Istituto.
1921. "La zecca di Roma", Rassegna d'arte antica e moderna 21, 361–368.
1957. Catalogo della collezione numismatica di Carlo Piancastelli. Forlí : Soc. Tipo litografia forlivese.

References

Roman archaeology
1879 births
1973 deaths
People from Fossano
Women classical scholars
Italian numismatists
Women numismatists
Sapienza University of Rome alumni